The Hebei–Chahar Political Council, or Hebei-Chahar Political Commission, was established at Beijing under Gen. Song Zheyuan, on 18th December 1935.

In 1935, under Japanese pressure, China signed the He-Umezu Agreement, which forbade the Kuomintang (KMT) from conducting party operations in Hebei and effectively ended Chinese control of that province. In the same year, the Chin-Doihara Agreement was signed and vacated the KMT from Chahar. By the end of 1935, the Chinese central government had virtually vacated from North China. In its place, the Japanese-backed East Hebei Autonomous Council was established on November 24, and Prince Teh, a leader of the Mongols in the provinces of what is now Inner Mongolia, was striving to set up an autonomous Mongolian Government there.

Kenji Doihara then tried to persuade General Song to set up an autonomous government in the Hebei - Chahar region. Resulting protests by Chinese citizens gave Japan the excuse to increase their garrison in the Tianjin area.  To prevent the forcible establishment of a Japanese puppet state, Song Zheyuan established the Hebei–Chahar Political Council on 18th December 1935, controlling the remainder of Hebei and Chahar provinces. Although the Hebei–Chahar Political Council rendered lip service to the Japanese effort to secure the secession of the five provinces of North China (Shandong, Hebei, Shanxi, Chahar, and Suiyuan) it made no vital concessions, the Chinese government still remained in control through the council.

It was officially dissolved on 20th August 1937, two weeks after the fall of Peking.

See also
 Second Sino-Japanese War
 Actions in Inner Mongolia (1933-36)
 Jia Deyao
 Liu Zhe
 History of Beijing

References 
 Mikiso Hane, Modern Japan: A Historical Survey, Westview Press, Japan, 2001, 554 pages.  

Second Sino-Japanese War